Statistics of Primera División de México in the 1962–63 season.

Overview

UNAM was promoted to Primera División.

The season was contested by 14 teams, and Oro won the championship.

Tampico was relegated to Segunda División.

Teams

League standings

Results

References
Mexico - List of final tables (RSSSF)

1962-63
Mex
1962–63 in Mexican football